Georgina F. Goss (born  1936) is a former member of the Michigan House of Representatives.

Career
In 1985, Goss served as the clerk of Northville Township. Goss later served as supervisor of Northville Township from 1988 to 1989. On August 27, 1991, Goss was elected as a member of the Michigan House of Representatives, where she represented the 36th district, in a special election, filling Gerald H. Law's vacancy in the chamber. Goss ran unopposed in the general election. Goss served until 1992. Goss was a Republican.

References

Living people
1930s births
People from Wayne County, Michigan
Women state legislators in Michigan
Republican Party members of the Michigan House of Representatives
20th-century American women politicians
20th-century American politicians
21st-century American women